Kempegowda Residential School is a private school, affiliated to ICSE and State Board. KGRS took off in the year 1999. The school is managed by Kempegowda Foundation. The school is located in Belagumba, Tumkur city, with the prime objective to impart education to each and every section of the society.

References

Pre University colleges in Karnataka
Schools in Tumkur district